Krista McCracken is a Canadian public historian, educator, curator and archivist known for their work raising awareness about the history of the Canadian Indian residential school system.

Career
McCracken holds an MA in public history from the University of Western Ontario. They work Researcher/Curator at Arthur A. Wishart Library and Shingwauk Residential Schools Centre, an archival repository and cross-cultural education centre within Algoma University where they have worked since 2010. McCracken's research focuses on community archives, residential schools, research and access. In their role they have supported former attendees of the Shingwauk Indian Residential School in developing survivor-driven art exhibits like Reclaiming Shingwauk Hall which opened in 2018. A book about the work being done by the Children of Shingwauk Alumni Association and staff at Shingwauk Residential Schools Centre co-authored by McCracken and former Shingwauk Residential Schools Centre student employee Skylee-Storm Hogan was announced in January 2021.

Beyond their work at Algoma University, Krista is an editor of ActiveHistory.ca and has served on the board of directors of the National Council on Public History. They also served as president of the Archives Association of Ontario from 2021 to 2022.

Awards
In 2021, McCracken was the first winner of Sault Ste. Marie's Community Builders Award (Education) in recognition of their achievement in education related the outputs of the Truth and Reconciliation Commission of Canada. The same year they won the best article prize for the article "Challenging Colonial Spaces: Reconciliation and Decolonizing Work in Canadian Archives"  Canadian Historical Association's Indigenous History Group.

Select publications

References

External links

Living people
Canadian archivists
University of Western Ontario alumni
Year of birth missing (living people)